Nancy Feber defeated Rita Grande in the final, 6–2, 7–5 to win the girls' singles tennis title at the 1993 Wimbledon Championships.

Seeds

  Nancy Feber (champion)
  Heike Rusch (quarterfinals)
 n/a
  Romana Tedjakusuma (first round)
 n/a
  Park Sung-hee (semifinals)
  Rita Grande (final)
  Julie Steven (third round)
  Laurence Courtois (quarterfinals)
 n/a
  Nino Louarsabishvili (quarterfinals)
  Janet Lee (third round)
  Mariana Díaz Oliva (third round)
  Martina Hingis (semifinals)
  Dally Randriantefy (third round)
  Miriam D'Agostini (first round)

Draw

Finals

Top half

Section 1

Section 2

Bottom half

Section 3

Section 4

References

External links

Girls' Singles
Wimbledon Championship by year – Girls' singles